Different Directions may refer to:
 Different Directions (John Denver album), 1991
 Different Directions (Champion album), 2007
 "Different Directions", a song  by Angie Stone from the Diary of a Mad Black Woman soundtrack